This page lists all historical and current federal and provincial electoral districts on Vancouver Island.

Federal

Current
North Island—Powell River
Courtenay—Alberni
Nanaimo—Ladysmith
Cowichan-Malahat-Langford
Esquimalt—Saanich—Sooke
Saanich—Gulf Islands
Victoria

Historical
All Vancouver Island ridings other than those immediately in and around Victoria are descended from the original Vancouver Island riding, which existed only as a temporary measure from the province's joining confederation in 1871 until elections with legally-mandated electoral districts was held the following year.  At that time the Vancouver Island riding was renamed simply Vancouver and its counterpart Victoria District was renamed Victoria.

Comox–Alberni
Comox—Atlin
Comox—Powell River
Cowichan—Malahat—The Islands
Esquimalt—Saanich
Nanaimo
Nanaimo—Cowichan—The Islands
North Island—Powell River
Vancouver
Vancouver Island
Victoria City
Victoria District

Provincial

Current

Comox Valley
 Cowichan Valley
Esquimalt-Royal Roads
Langford-Juan de Fuca
Mid-Island-Pacific Rim
Nanaimo
Nanaimo-North Cowichan
North Island
Oak Bay-Gordon Head
Saanich North and the Islands
Saanich South
Victoria-Beacon Hill
Victoria-Hillside

Historical
Alberni
Alberni-Qualicum
Alberni-Nanaimo
Cowichan
Cowichan-Alberni
Cowichan-Ladysmith
Cowichan-Malahat
Malahat-Juan de Fuca
Newcastle
Cowichan-Newcastle
Esquimalt
Esquimalt-Port Renfrew
Esquimalt-Metchosin
Nanaimo City
Nanaimo and the Islands
Nanaimo-Parksville
The Islands
Saanich and the Islands
Oak Bay
North Victoria
South Victoria
Victoria
Victoria City
Parksville
Parksville-Qualicum

References
Elections BC Historical Returns

British Columbia electoral districts
History of Vancouver Island
British Columbia politics-related lists